Hattorf am Harz is a Samtgemeinde ("collective municipality") in the district of Göttingen, in Lower Saxony, Germany.
Its seat is in the village Hattorf am Harz.

The Samtgemeinde Hattorf am Harz consists of the following municipalities:
 Elbingerode 
 Hattorf am Harz
 Hörden am Harz
 Wulften am Harz

Samtgemeinden in Lower Saxony
Göttingen (district)